Klusemann is a surname. Notable people with the surname include:

 Georg Klusemann (1942–1981), German painter and illustrator
 Caterina Klusemann (born 1973), documentary filmmaker, Georg's daughter

See also
 Klusmann
 Klussmann